El indio is a 1939 Mexican drama film directed by Armando Vargas de la Maza. It was released in Mexico on February 10, 1939 and later released in United States on May 12, of the same year. Consuelo Frank and Pedro Armendáriz received equal billing, while Dolores Camarillo (billed as Dolores C. de Frausto) who was the film's comic relief, was billed last. Later she would receive a somewhat higher billing in Cantinflas' Ahí está el detalle.

The film also explores an early form of Mexican "indio" comic performances given by Carlos López "Chaflán" and Dolores Camarillo. These comic roles would later give inspiration to María Elena Velasco's La India María film series.

Synopsis
El indio centers on an hacienda somewhere in central-Mexico owned by an ambitious landowner who mistreats his indigenous peones. One of the peons, Felipe (Pedro Armendáriz), has separated himself from the hacienda and the tribe and relies on hunting to survive. He is in love with María (Consuelo Frank), a beautiful white Indian girl who is constantly beleaguered by the hacienda's owner.

Cast
Consuelo Frank as María
Pedro Armendáriz as Felipe
Eduardo Vivas as Hacendado
Gloria Morel as Cristina
Carlos López "Chaflán"
Enrique Cancino		
Ángel T. Sala
Ernesto Finance		
Alfonso Parra
Jesús Ojeda
Rafael Icardo	
Dolores C. de Frausto as Panchita
Max Langler as Indian (uncredited)

External links

1939 films
1930s Spanish-language films
Mexican black-and-white films
Mexican drama films
1939 drama films
1930s Mexican films